Gourmet Foods is Pakistani retail chain of food products with its company headquarters in Lahore, Pakistan. It has seven processing units across the country and over 100 stores in Lahore.

It has outlets in Hafizabad, Dera Ismail Khan, Sargodha, Islamabad, Rawalpindi, many in Lahore, Multan, Faisalabad, Gujranwala, Wazirabad, Chakwal, Gujrat, Layyah, Jalalpur Jattan, Sheikhupura, Sahiwal, Multan, Bahawalpur, Yazman Mandi and Yazman. It also has international outlets in London and New York City.

History

Gourmet Foods was founded by Muhammad Nawaz Chattha of a small village Kookan Wala near Hafizabad district gujranwala in 1987. A small confectionery shop was opened on September 10, 1987, in Samnabad, Lahore, Pakistan.

Other business ventures
The group currently owns a 12 percent stake in Silkbank and has also invested in the magazine publishing, furnishing, and pharmaceutical sectors.

In 2018, the group ventured into the media industry and launched its news channel GNN. The channel is a re-branding of the previously existing Jaag TV network (formerly known as CNBC Pakistan), which Gourmet acquired in 2016 for Rs. 1.5 billion.

The IT Company of the Group is Gicoh and its head office is based in Lahore.

Products
Sweets,
Drinks (gourmet cola),
Bakery items

See also
 List of bakery cafés

References

Bakeries of Pakistan
Drink companies of Pakistan
Bottled water brands
Pakistani brands
Companies based in Lahore
Catering and food service companies of Pakistan
Dairy products companies of Pakistan
Food manufacturers of Pakistan
Brand name confectionery
Bakery cafés
Pizza chains of Pakistan
Restaurant chains in Pakistan
Restaurant franchises
Pakistani companies established in 1987
Restaurants established in 1987
Coffeehouses and cafés in Pakistan
Restaurants in Lahore